Marie-Danielle Croteau (born August 1, 1953) is a Canadian writer of youth literature living in Quebec and Central America.

She was born in Saint-Élie-d'Orford (now Sherbrooke) in the Estrie region and studied communications and art history in university. She worked as a journalist, as a researcher and radio columnist for Radio-Canada and was Chief Information Officer for the Montreal Museum of Fine Arts. She has travelled to Africa, to France, to the Antilles, to Polynesia and to Central America. Her books have been translated into English, Portuguese, Chinese and Créole.

Selected works 
 Un vent de liberté (1993), received the 
 Un monde à la dérive (1994), finalist for a Governor General's Award
 Le chat de mes rêves (1994), illustrations by Bruno St-Aubin, translated into English by Sarah Cummins as Fred's dream cat (1995)
 Un pas dans l’éternité (1997), finalist for the Prix Brive/Montréal
 La grande aventure d'un petit mouton noir (1999), illustrations by Geneviève Côté, translated into English by Sheila Fischman as The amazing story of the little black sheep (1999)
 Un gnome à la mer (2002), received an award from the Alcuin Society of Vancouver, translated into English by Sheila Fischman as Gnome overboard (2002)
 L'autobus colère (2003), illustrations by Sophie Casson, received a Mr. Christie's Book Award
 Le coeur de monsieur Gauguin (2004), illustrated by Isabelle Arsenault, received the Governor General's Award for French-language children's illustration

References 

1953 births
Living people
Writers from Sherbrooke
Canadian writers of young adult literature